Marcel Seip (born 5 April 1982) is a Dutch former professional footballer who plays as a centre back for ACV in the Dutch Hoofdklasse. He previously played for Veendam, Heerenveen, Plymouth Argyle, Blackpool, Sheffield United, Charlton Athletic, Bradford City, VVV Venlo, Central Coast Mariners and FC Emmen.

Club career

Veendam
Born in Winschoten, Seip made his debut for Eerste Divisie side BV Veendam in 1999, making six appearances in the 1999–2000 season. The following season he played 18 league games. Seip made a total of 27 league appearances for Veendam.

Heerenveen
In 2001 Seip signed for Eredivisie club SC Heerenveen, making his debut in the 2002–03 season and went on to make six league appearances that season, as Heerenveen finished in seventh place, qualifying for the 2003 UEFA Intertoto Cup. Seip played in all five of the club's games in the Intertoto Cup, as they reached the finals, where they lost to Spanish La Liga side Villarreal.

In 2003–04, he made 31 league appearances and scored one goal as Heerenveen finished in fourth place, qualifying for the 2004–05 UEFA Cup. The following season he made 30 league appearances, scoring one goal and made six appearances in the UEFA Cup. Heerveneen qualified for the 2005–06 UEFA Cup in which he played seven games, whilst making a further 28 Eredivisie appearances.

Seip was though unable to keep a regular place in the starting line up and his contract expired during the summer of 2006. He made a total of 113 appearances, scoring 3 goals in five years with Heerenveen.

Plymouth Argyle
After a trial with Russian side Spartak Moscow, Seip moved to England on 7 September 2006 with Championship club Plymouth Argyle, initially on a three-month contract.

He made his debut for the Pilgrims on 16 September 2006, as a 31st-minute substitute in a 1–0 defeat to Southampton at St. Mary's Stadium. His first goal coincided with his full debut in a 3–1 victory over Norwich City at Home Park a week later.

In November, Seip agreed to a three-year contract, tying him to the club until the summer of 2009. Seip was an ever-present in the starting line-up, making 42 league and cup appearances, and scoring two goals, in his first season.

On 5 April 2008, Seip refused to be a substitute in a league fixture against Charlton Athletic, after having made four successive starts. He was subsequently fined two weeks wages, and placed on the transfer list, by manager Paul Sturrock.

On 4 July, Seip apologised to Sturrock and his teammates over the Charlton affair. As a result, the club removed him from the transfer list. In the 2008–09 season Seip was once again a regular in the first-team and in November 2008, renewed his contract with Argyle, tying him to the club until the summer of 2011. He made a total of 42 appearances that season, scoring three goals.

After a 1–3 defeat at home to Sheffield Wednesday on 29 August 2009, Seip was again placed on the transfer list after a "breach of discipline", reported to have been a "dressing room bust up with manager Paul Sturrock".

Loan moves
On 28 September it was reported that Seip was set to join fellow Championship side Blackpool on a one-month loan deal, where he would join up with his former manager Ian Holloway. The following day it was confirmed that Seip had signed for the Seasiders the previous evening, on loan until 31 October. Later that day he was an unused substitute in Blackpool's 2–0 defeat to Bristol City at Ashton Gate Stadium.

His first appearance was for the reserve team in their 4–3 Central League Division One West win over Preston North End on 14 October. After receiving clearance to play, three days later he made his first team debut, and scored the opening goal in a 2–0 win over his parent club, Plymouth Argyle, at Bloomfield Road. After the game Seip said of both his goal and Paul Sturrock, "I'm delighted to have scored. I was training on my own at Plymouth. I'll never play for that man again, and he'll never pick me. Yes, we have had a big fallout but Blackpool have given me a chance and I want to take it"

However, the goal and the fact that Plymouth allowed Seip to play in the game created controversy with Argyle club captain Carl Fletcher later saying, "Marcel playing for Blackpool should never have happened. It made the whole club look like a Mickey Mouse club, and players take that to heart. At the end of the season, if we get relegated by one goal, that's going to affect the livelihoods of 30-odd players here and people working at the club."

In his second game for the club Seip opened the scoring, in a 3–0 win at home to Sheffield United on 20 October. It was his second goal, both of them headers, in three days. He was named in The Championship "Team of the Week", along with teammates Stephen Crainey and Matthew Gilks, following his performance in Blackpool's 0–0 draw with Swansea City on 24 October at the Liberty Stadium. On 3 November his loan spell was extended by a further two months until 29 December. With his loan deal at Blackpool expired, Seip signed on loan for Sheffield United on 1 January 2010 until the end of the 2009–10 season. His time at Bramall Lane was interrupted by injuries however, and he made only eight appearances for the South Yorkshire club before his loan spell expired. In June 2011, Seip was awarded £70,000 in damages following a bonus dispute with Blackpool, due to Blackpool's promotion to the Premier League.

Bradford City
In October 2011, three months after being released by Plymouth Argyle, he joined Bradford City on a three-month contract. Seip made his debut, on 15 October 2011, in a 2–0 loss against Hereford United. He scored his first goal for the club in a 2–2 draw at home to Morecambe, scoring the rebound after a James Hanson shot was blocked. Shortly scoring his first goal for the club, Seip signed a new deal with Bradford City, keeping him until the end of the season. Seip continued to become a regular in the first team until on 17 March 2012, Seip suffered an shoulder injury in a 1–0 loss against Aldershot Town. Having missed three games, Seip's shoulder injury ruled him out for the rest of the season. At the end of the season, Seip was released by the club.

VVV-Venlo
After being released, Seip signed for Eredivisie club VVV-Venlo, on 16 July 2012, returning him to his homeland after six-years abroad, having trained with the club on trial, since 3 July 2012. On the opening game of the season, Seip made his debut, in a 1–1 draw against Heracles Almelo; weeks later, Seip scored his first goal in a 4–2 loss against ADO Den Haag. Seip since then established himself in the first team, forming a central partnership with Ismo Vorstermans. Seip also scored three goals against RKC Waalwijk and SC Heerenveen (both fixtures in the league). Seip became the highest scoring defender in the Eredivisie and quickly established himself as a fans favourite due to his no nonsense approach to defending.

Central Coast Mariners
On 8 June 2013 Seip signed for reigning A-League Champions Central Coast Mariners on a three-year deal. He made his Mariners debut as a substitute in the first round of the 2013–14 A-League, coming on with ten minutes remaining in a draw with Western Sydney Wanderers. Seip scored his first goal for the Mariners in the 2014 AFC Champions League against Beijing Guoan. His volley in the 73rd minute was the only goal of the game.
Seip left Central Coast Mariners after the end of the 2013/14 A-League season, well short of his initial 3-year deal due to a change of ownership at the club nullifying all player contracts, and not being offered a continuation of the original term.

FC Emmen
On 28 July 2014, Seip joined FC Emmen, signing a 2-year contract with an option for a third year.

Personal life
Seip married his longtime girlfriend Lucy, daughter of former Plymouth Argyle chairman Paul Stapleton, on 13 June 2009 in Gunnislake. The couple have a son called Walter Paul Seip, who was born on 22 July 2010, and a son called Sidney, who was born on 9 June 2012, both in Plymouth. Mrs Seip gained a 2.1 law degree from the University of Plymouth in 2009.

Career statistics

References

External links
Marcel Seip at Voetbal International

 Marcel Seip player profile at pafc.co.uk
 Marcel Seip player profile at blackpoolfc.co.uk

1982 births
Living people
A-League Men players
Association football defenders
Blackpool F.C. players
Bradford City A.F.C. players
Central Coast Mariners FC players
Charlton Athletic F.C. players
Dutch expatriate footballers
Dutch footballers
Eerste Divisie players
Eredivisie players
Expatriate footballers in England
Netherlands under-21 international footballers
People from Winschoten
Plymouth Argyle F.C. players
SC Heerenveen players
SC Veendam players
Sheffield United F.C. players
English Football League players
VVV-Venlo players
Footballers from Groningen (province)
Asser Christelijke Voetbalvereniging players
Expatriate soccer players in Australia
Dutch expatriate sportspeople in England
Dutch expatriate sportspeople in Australia